Stilla anomala is a species of sea snail, a marine gastropod mollusk in the family Raphitomidae.

Description
The length of the shell attains 1.6 mm, its diameter 0.9 mm.

Distribution
This marine species is endemic to New Zealand and occurs off Otago, South Island, N of Auckland Islands and off Snares Islands.

References

 Powell, A.W.B. (1955) Mollusca of the southern islands of New Zealand. Department of Scientific and Industrial Research Cape Expedition Series Bulletin, 15, 1–151, 5 pls.
 Spencer, H.G., Marshall, B.A. & Willan, R.C. (2009). Checklist of New Zealand living Mollusca. Pp 196-219. in: Gordon, D.P. (ed.) New Zealand inventory of biodiversity. Volume one. Kingdom Animalia: Radiata, Lophotrochozoa, Deuterostomia. Canterbury University Press, Christchurch.

External links
 
 Spencer H.G., Willan R.C., Marshall B.A. & Murray T.J. (2011). Checklist of the Recent Mollusca Recorded from the New Zealand Exclusive Economic Zone

anomala
Gastropods described in 1955
Gastropods of New Zealand